Epepeotes jeanvoinei is a species of beetle in the family Cerambycidae. It was described by Maurice Pic in 1935.

References

jeanvoinei
Beetles described in 1935